The Space Ritual Alive in Liverpool and London (commonly known as Space Ritual) is a 1973 live double album recorded in 1972 by UK rock band Hawkwind. It is their fourth album, reached #9 in the UK album charts and briefly dented the Billboard Top 200, peaking at #179.

Background
The album was recorded during the tour to promote their Doremi Fasol Latido album, which comprises the bulk of this set. In addition there are new tracks ("Born To Go", "Upside Down" and "Orgone Accumulator") and the songs are interspersed by electronic and spoken pieces, making this one continuous performance. Their recent hit single "Silver Machine" was excluded from the set, and only "Master of the Universe" remains from their first two albums.

The Space Ritual show attempted to create a full audio-visual experience, representing themes developed by Barney Bubbles and Robert Calvert entwining the fantasy of starfarers in suspended animation traveling through time and space with the concept of the music of the spheres. The performance featured dancers Stacia, Miss Renee and Tony Carrera, stage set by Bubbles, lightshow by Liquid Len and poetry recitations by Calvert. On entering the venue, audience members were given a programme (reproduced on the 1996 remaster CD) featuring a short sci-fi story by Bubbles setting the band in a Starfarers scenario returning to Earth.

The original release featured edits and overdubs, the sleeve notes explaining that "We had to cut a piece out of Brainstorm and Time We Left because they were too long", but the 1985 Space Ritual Volume 2 album contains the full unedited versions. A previously unheard edited version of "You Shouldn't Do That" (segued with an unlisted "Seeing It As You Really Are") from this concert was included on the 1976 Roadhawks compilation album, then subsequently included as a bonus track on the 1996 remaster CD. The full unedited version of the track can be found on the Hawkwind Anthology album. June 2007 saw another EMI 2CD remaster issue with different bonus tracks and DVD-audio - this remaster would be reissued in 2013, minus the DVD-audio.

"Sonic Attack" had been written by science fiction author Michael Moorcock, who often performed with the band when convenient and Calvert was unavailable. Here it is recited by Calvert and it was scheduled for single release, promotional copies being distributed in a cloth sleeve, but it never did receive a full release.

In the Q & Mojo Classic Special Edition Pink Floyd & The Story of Prog Rock, the album came #8 in its list of "40 Cosmic Rock Albums".  The album was also included in the book 1001 Albums You Must Hear Before You Die at #276.

Track listing
Side 1
"Earth Calling" (Robert Calvert) – 1:44
"Born to Go" (Calvert, Dave Brock) – 9:56
"Down Through the Night" (Brock) – 6:16
"The Awakening" (Calvert) – 1:32
Side 2
"Lord of Light" (Brock) – 7:21
"Black Corridor" (Michael Moorcock) – 1:51
"Space Is Deep" (Brock) – 8:13
"Electronic No. 1" (Michael "Dik Mik" Davies, Del Dettmar) – 2:26
Side 3
"Orgone Accumulator" (Calvert, Brock) – 9:59
"Upside Down" (Brock) – 2:43
"10 Seconds of Forever" (Calvert) – 2:05
"Brainstorm" (Nik Turner) – 9:20
Side 4
"Seven By Seven" (Brock) – 6:11
"Sonic Attack" (Moorcock) – 2:54
"Time We Left This World Today" (Brock) – 5:47
"Master of the Universe" (Turner, Brock) – 7:37
"Welcome to the Future" (Calvert) – 2:04
Bonus tracks on 1996 Remasters CD
"You Shouldn't Do That" (Turner, Brock) / "Seeing It As You Really Are" [unlisted] (Brock) – 6:58
"Master of the Universe" (Turner, Brock) – 7:23
"Born to Go" (Calvert, Brock) – 13:02

2007 Digital remaster

CD 1
"Earth Calling"
"Born to Go"
"Down Through the Night"
"The Awakening"
"Lord of Light"
"Black Corridor"
"Space Is Deep"
"Electronic No. 1"
"Orgone Accumulator"
"Upside Down"
"10 Seconds of Forever"
"Brainstorm" (full version) - 13:46
CD 2
"7 By 7"
"Sonic Attack"
"Time We Left This World Today"
"Master of the Universe"
"Welcome to the Future" (full version) - 2:49
"You Shouldn't Do That" (full version) - 10:38 
"Orgone Accumulator" (alternate nights performance) - 8:50
"Time We Left This World Today" (alternate nights performance) - 13:22
"You Shouldn't Do That" (alternate nights performance, from the Roadhawks compilation album) - 6:42

DVD Audio
tracks are in both DTS 96/24 and 24 bit/48 kHz Stereo format
"Earth Calling"
"Born to Go"
"Down Through the Night"
"The Awakening"
"Lord of Light"
"Black Corridor"
"Space Is Deep"
"Electronic No. 1"
"Orgone Accumulator"
"Upside Down"
"10 Seconds of Forever"
"Brainstorm"
"7 By 7"
"Sonic Attack"
"Time We Left This World Today"
"Master of the Universe"
"Welcome to the Future"
"You Shouldn't Do That"

Charts

Personnel

Hawkwind
Dave Brock – guitar; vocals (tracks 2, 3, 5, 7, 10, 13, 15)
Nik Turner – saxophone, flute; vocals (tracks 2, 19, 20)
Lemmy (Ian Kilmister) – bass guitar; vocals (tracks 6, 7, 13, 15)
Dik Mik (Michael Davies) – audio generator, electronics
Del Dettmar – synthesizer
Simon King – drums
Robert "Bob" Calvert – poetry, vocals ("poet and swazzle" on the album credits) (tracks 4, 6, 9, 11, 14)
Stacia - dancer and visual artist

Recording
Recorded at Liverpool Stadium, 22 December 1972 and Brixton Sundown, 30 December 1972 by Vic Maile and the Pye Mobile.
Produced by Hawkwind. Mixed by Vic Maile and Anton Matthews at Olympic Studios, Barnes.
"You Shouldn't Do That" (bonus track) recorded at Brixton Sundown, 30 December 1972. Originally released on the Roadhawks compilation album.
"Master Of The Universe" and "Born To Go" (bonus tracks on the 1996 2CD release) were recorded at The Roundhouse, 13 February 1972. Originally released on the Greasy Truckers Party Various Artists album.

Sleeve
The sleeve was designed by Barney Bubbles and came in 3x2 panel foldout, the outer 6 panels being colour, the inner 6 panels being monochrome, the discs in psychedelic patterned orange & yellow inner sleeves were folded into this. It made Q Magazine's 100 greatest album covers list.
The outer foldout features an illustration of Miss Stacia flanked by the hounds of King over stage shots of the band.
The inner foldout features three panels of a photograph of outer space with three illustrations on each panel headed by lines from a Hawkwind song.
Inner panel 1: features a vintage photograph of a naked woman with listed credits.
Inner panel 2: chac bacab – features an image of a female nipple as a planet, and a legend of the Earth as a living entity.
Inner panel 3: kan bacab – features an image of a foetus suspended in space with the legend "The Universe resounds with the joyful cry I AM. I am Alpha and Omega, the beginning and the end, the first and the last. Naked I came out of my mothers womb and naked shall I return thither."
Inner panel 4: Features a mandala with the legend "Everything exists for itself, yet everything is part of something else. The One and the many contain in themselves the principles of time and space. The way up and the way down are one and the same."
Inner panel 5: Features a dedication from Lemmy to John the Bog, Supernova and Sue Bennett. zac bacab, tec bacab and bac bacab expounds upon religious and cosmological myths and sciences, starting with the William Blake Auguries of Innocence poem "To see a world in a grain of sand, And a heaven in a wild flower, Hold infinity in the palm of your hand, And eternity in an hour", ending with the Alfred Whitehead quote "Give up illusions about ideas of order, accept nothing of inherited norm. Spread joy and revolution. It is the business of the future to be dangerous."
Inner panel 6: features a winged superhero grasping an electrical cable and lightning bolts, perched upon an Earth situated in a void.

Notes
"The Awakening" is a spoken piece which had previously been printed in the Hawklog which accompanied the group's 1971 In Search of Space album.
"Black Corridor" is a spoken piece, adapted from the Michael Moorcock book of the same name.
"Orgone Accumulator" lyrics were inspired by Wilhelm Reich. Pop Will Eat Itself covered the song in 1987 on their "Love Missile F1-11" single.

Release history
May 1973: United Artists Records, UAD60037/8, UK vinyl – original issues came in 6-panel fold-out sleeve with inner sleeves. Subsequent releases in gatefold sleeve.
September 1992: One Way Records, S2257659, USA CD
March 1996: EMI Remasters, HAWKS4, UK CD – initial copies in digipak with reproduction of the Space Ritual tour programme (An extract from the Saga of Doremi Fasol Latido)
June 2007: EMI Remasters, UK 2CD+DVD
11 October 2010: Rock Classics, RCV016LP, UK, 2x12" vinyl 1000 copies; RCV017LP, UK, 2x12" vinyl 1000 copies
21 January 2013: Parlophone Records, HAWKSS 4, Europe 2CD - re-issue of 2007 release, but without DVD - 6 panel fold-out inlay - track listing as per 1996 CD release

Volume 2

Space Ritual Volume 2 is an archive live album by Hawkwind released in 1985 consisting of a live performance from 1972. The tapes were licensed by Dave Brock to former Hawkwind bass player Dave Anderson for release.

This recording is part of the performance that was processed for disc 2 of Space Ritual. Here it is in its original state, with no edits or overdubs, notable differences being a different middle section to "Orgone Accumulator", "Paranoia" included as the middle section of "Time We Left This World Today" and "Wind of Change" leading into "7 By 7". "Space Is Deep" and "You Shouldn't Do That" / "Seeing It As You Really Are" from this tape were released on Hawkwind Anthology.

"Electronic No. 1" [listed as "Space"] (Dettmar/Dik Mik) – 2:15
"Orgone Accumulator" (Calvert/Brock) – 8:45
"Upside Down" (Brock) – 2:45
"Sonic Attack" (Moorcock) – 2:50
"Time We Left This World Today" (Brock) / "Paranoia" [unlisted] (Brock) – 13:20
"10 Seconds of Forever" (Calvert) – 2:10
"Brainstorm" (Turner) – 12:00
"Wind of Change" [unlisted] (Brock)"7 By 7" (Brock) – 8:50
"Master of the Universe" (Turner/Brock) – 7:40
"Welcome to the Future" (Calvert) – 2:55

see starfarer for full catalogue of releases, re-releases, retitles of this album.

Space Ritual Live 2014

On Saturday 22 February 2014, Hawkwind performed a one-off show at the Shepherd's Bush Empire, London in conjunction with Rock 4 Rescue in aid of various animal charities (Wet Nose Animal Aid, Animals Asia Foundation, Team Badger and Doris Banham Dog Rescue). The night consisted of two sets, the second being an almost entire run-through of the original Space Ritual album - "Electronic Number 1" being replaced by a new electronic instrumental piece titled "A Step into Space". The event was compered by TV presenter Matthew Wright, and the group were joined by former Soft Machine guitarist John Etheridge on "Down Through The Night" and "Space Is Deep", while "Sonic Attack" was recited from a pre-recording by Brian Blessed who had been involved in other Team Badger projects including the "Save the Badger Badger Badger" single with Brian May.

The recording was released by Gonzo Media on 30 March 2015 in three formats: 2CD, 2CD/DVD-Video (set 2), and 2CD/2DVD-Video (both sets).

Disc 1
"Seasons" (Jonathan Hulme Derbyshire, Niall Hone, Richard Chadwick)
"Steppenwolf" (Robert Calvert, Dave Brock)
"Arrival in Utopia" [listed as "Utopia"] (Michael Moorcock, Brock)
"Opa Loka" (Alan Powell, Simon King)
"Spiral Galaxy" (Simon House)
"Reefer Madness" (Calvert, Brock)
"Sentinel" (Derbyshire, Hone, Chadwick, Tim Blake)
"Spirit of the Age" (Calvert, Brock)

Disc 2
"Earth Calling"
"Born To Go"
"Down Through The Night"
"The Awakening" [listed as "First Landing on Medusa"]
"Lord of Light"
"The Black Corridor"
"Space is Deep"
"A Step into Space"
"Orgone Accumulator"
"Upside Down"
"The Tenth Second Forever"
"Brainstorm"
"Seven by Seven"
"Sonic Attack"
"Time We Left (This World Today)"
"Masters of the Universe"
"Welcome To The Future"

Personnel
Dave Brock - guitar, vocals
Lemmy - vocals, bass
Tim Blake - keyboards, theremin
Frederick de la Mort (Philip Reeves) - keyboards, violin
Richard Chadwick - drums
John Etheridge - guitar ("Down Through The Night" and "Space Is Deep")
Brian Blessed - vocals ("Sonic Attack")

Release history
30 March 2015 - 2CD, Gonzo Media, HAWKGZ102CD
30 March 2015 - 2CD/DVD, Gonzo Media, HAWKGZ103DVD
30 March 2015 - 2CD/2DVD, Gonzo Media, HAWKGZ104SE

References
Footnotes

Citations

External links

Space Ritual (Adobe Flash) at Radio3Net (streamed copy where licensed)
Starfarer – NME review, 19 May 1973
Starfarer – Mojo review, July 1999
Starfarer – Classic Rock review, Nov 2000
 
  - Space Ritual Live

United Artists Records live albums
Hawkwind live albums
1973 live albums
Liberty Records live albums
Parlophone live albums